The Olyokma-Stanovik (Olyokminsky Stanovik) is a system of mountain ranges in Zabaykalsky Krai, Russia. The western end of the range reaches into Amur Oblast.

Geography 
The Olyokma-Stanovik is part of the South Siberian System. Some of the ranges are separated by intermontane basins, such as the Upper Olyokma Depression, the Tungir Depression and the Nenyugin Depression. 

The range rises in an area prone to earthquakes.

Subranges
The ranges of the highlands include the following:

Olyokma-Stanovik Range, highest point  (unnamed)
Cheromny Range, highest point  (unnamed)
Western Lyundor Range, highest point  (unnamed) 
Urusha Range, highest point  (unnamed); it includes the Nyukzha Ridge, a spur of the range where the sources of the Nyukzha river are located.
Kiteme-Yunikal (хребет Китэмэ-Юникал), located in Tyndinsky District, Amur Oblast

Hydrography
The Olyokma-Stanovik forms the main watershed between the rivers of the Lena basin (flowing into the Arctic Ocean) and the ones of the Amur basin (flowing into the Pacific Ocean). The Olyokma, a right tributary of the Lena, and its tributaries Srednyaya Mokla, Tungir and Nyukzha have their sources in the highlands. Other important rivers originating in the highlands are the Nercha, Kuenga and Cherna, left tributaries of the Shilka, as well as the left tributaries of the Amur: Amazar, Urka and Urusha, among others.

Flora
At elevations above  there is mountain tundra. Many peaks are crowned by ‘’golets’’ type bare summits.

See also
List of mountains and hills of Russia

References

South Siberian Mountains
Mountain ranges of Russia
Landforms of Zabaykalsky Krai
Landforms of Amur Oblast
ru:Олёкминский Становик (нагорье)